Navy Operational Support Center Quincy is a United States Navy Reserve support center located in Quincy, Massachusetts. It was re-opened per the recommendations of the 1995 Base Realignment and Closure Commission, after being recommended for closure by the 1993 Base Realignment and Closure Commission.

See also
List of military installations in Massachusetts

References

Installations of the United States Navy in Massachusetts
Quincy, Massachusetts